is a Japanese professional footballer who plays as a right back for Omiya Ardija, on loan from FC Tokyo.

Career
Shuto Okaniwa joined FC Tokyo in 2016. On September 11, he debuted in J3 League (v Grulla Morioka).

In July 2022, Okaniwa moved on loan to Omiya Ardija.

References

External links

1999 births
Living people
Association football people from Saitama Prefecture
Japanese footballers
J1 League players
J3 League players
FC Tokyo players
FC Tokyo U-23 players
Omiya Ardija players
Association football defenders